Leslie Brown may refer to:

 Leslie Brown (RAF officer) (1893–1978), Royal Air Force officer who served in World War II
 Leslie Brown (historian) (1954–2016), American historian
 Leslie E. Brown (1920–1997), U.S. Marine aviator
 Leslie Brown (bishop) (1912–1999), Archbishop of Uganda
 Leslie C. Brown (born 1945), former member of the Ohio House of Representatives
 Leslie Brown (bowls), Fijian bowls player, medallist at 1950 British Empire Games
 Leslie Brown (English footballer) (1936–2021), English football midfielder
 Leslie Hilton Brown (1917–1980), British ornithologist
 Darby Brown (1929–1988, born Leslie Brown), Australian boxer of the 1940s and 1950s 
 Leslie Brown (Scottish footballer), Scottish footballer of the 1950s

See also
 
 Leslie Browne (born 1957), American ballet dancer and actress
 Les Brown (disambiguation)